The Great Synagogue of Constanța is a disused former Ashkenazi synagogue ”for the Jews called « Polish »”, located at 2 C. A. Rosetti Street, corner with Petru Rareş Street in the city of Constanța, Romania.

The synagogue was built between 1910 and 1914 in a Moorish Revival architectural style on the site of an earlier synagogue, erected in 1867/1872, in the
place of an older synagogue, built after a firman of Sultan Abdul Azis.The first steps were initiated in 1907, but the original building application submitted in 1908 was denied due to concerns about the strength of the proposed dome and galleries. Architect Anghel Păunescu thus replaced the proposed dome with a semi-cylindrical vault intended to express the same "seduction of the curved space".

In the interwar period, there had been two main synagogues in Constanța: there was also a  Sephardic Temple, built between 1905 and 1908 in a Catalan Gothic architectural style, The sephardic synagogue was heavily damaged during the Second World War when it was used as an ammunition warehouse, later further damaged by an earthquake, and was demolished in 1989 under the rule of Nicolae Ceaușescu.

Condition
As the Jewish population in Constanța declined, the synagogue fell into disuse. Photographs show the synagogue was still in use - and in good repair - as recently as 1996, but once abandoned, the building had been "ransacked of anything not nailed down". The structure of the building is still standing, but is in an advanced state of degradation and is in danger of collapsing.

Only three of the four walls are intact, and the roof has partially collapsed. A tree grows in the middle of the sanctuary and most of the stained glass windows have been smashed.

Journalists Florin Anghel and Cristian Andrei Leonte blamed local officials and popular opinion for allowing the building to "crumble to the point of collapse", noting that synagogues in other cities were "splendidly renovated and converted into cultural centres or exhibition halls." Aurel Vainer, president of the Federation of the Jewish Communities in Romania, blamed lack of interest for the deterioration of the synagogue.

In November 2014, a team of architects from Bucharest were hired to inspect the building, assess the necessary repairs and estimate costs.

Architecture
The synagogue has three levels. The exterior doors and windows display a Moorish influence. Inside, the worship area is divided into three naves with traditional Jewish decorations.

See also
 History of the Jews in Romania
 List of synagogues in Romania

References

External links

 Sinagoga Mare din Constanța pe situl Biserici.org

Ashkenazi Jewish culture in Romania
Ashkenazi synagogues
Synagogues in Romania
Buildings and structures in Constanța
Synagogues completed in 1911
1911 establishments in Romania
Gothic Revival synagogues
Former synagogues
Polish-Jewish diaspora